Anthony Hayde (5 December 1932 – 20 November 2014) was a New Zealand field hockey player. He competed in the men's tournament at the 1960 Summer Olympics.

References

External links
 

1932 births
2014 deaths
New Zealand male field hockey players
Olympic field hockey players of New Zealand
Field hockey players at the 1960 Summer Olympics
Sportspeople from Dehradun
20th-century New Zealand people
21st-century New Zealand people